Matouš (also Matous) is a Czech surname and given name variant of the name "Matthew". September 21 is its name day in the Czech Republic. Notable people with the name include:

 Matouš Ruml (born 1985), Czech actor
 Jan Matouš (born 1961), Czechoslovakian biathlete
 Josef Matouš (born 1942), Czechoslovakian ski jumper
 Elena Matous (born 1953), Italian alpine skier who competed for San Marino, Iran and Luxembourg
 Matouš Kalvach (born 1993), Czech singer, also known as "Kalwich"

See also
 Matouš the Cobbler, 1948 Czechoslovak drama film
 Studio Matouš, Czech company that publishes and distributes CDs with classical music

Czech masculine given names
Czech-language surnames

de:Matous
fr:Matouš